The Hilton Singapore Orchard is a 1080-room five-star hotel located at 333 Orchard Road in Singapore.

History
The hotel opened in 1971 as The Mandarin Singapore, occupying a single 36-storey block facing Orchard Road. Designed by Cyrus Casper Francis, it had 700 rooms. Atop the hotel was the Top of the 'M' , the highest revolving restaurant in Singapore. It has since been converted to a club lounge, open to guests who belong to the hotel chain's loyalty program.

The hotel added a second block in the rear, standing 40 storeys and 152 metres high, in 1973. With the addition, designed by Lee Sian Teck Chartered Architects, the hotel became the tallest building in Singapore.

The hotel was renamed Meritus Mandarin Singapore in 2002. It underwent a S$200 million renovation in 2009. The ground level lobby and the lower levels were converted to a shopping mall, The Mandarin Gallery. The hotel lobby was relocated to level 5, beside the swimming pool. At the conclusion of the renovations, in 2010, the hotel was renamed the Mandarin Orchard Singapore.

On 24 February 2022, the hotel was renamed Hilton Singapore Orchard. The nearby Hilton Singapore was renamed voco Orchard Singapore in January 2022.

Facilities
The Chatterbox restaurant at the hotel is well known for its award-winning Hainanese chicken rice. In 2007, a co-creator of the dish, Steven Low, was laid off after 31 years of service. He promptly opened his own restaurant, serving the same dish at a quarter of the price. The Mandarin Gallery shopping mall houses boutiques including Montblanc (pens), Emporio Armani, Marc by Marc Jacobs, D&G, Vertu, Just Cavalli and Mauboussin, as well as restaurants such as Ippudo and the one-Michelin-starred Beni.

References

External links

Hilton Singapore Orchard official website

Buildings and structures completed in 1971
Skyscraper hotels in Singapore
Orchard Road
Buildings and structures with revolving restaurants
Orchard, Singapore
Retail buildings in Singapore
Hotels established in 1971
Hotel buildings completed in 1971
20th-century architecture in Singapore